

Sovereign states

A
 – Alipura
Algiers – Sultanate of Algiers
 – Principality of Andorra
Arakan - Kingdom of Mrauk U
 – Asante Union
Assam – Kingdom of Assam

B
 – Bamana Empire
 – Benin Empire
 – Sultanate of Brunei
 – Kingdom of Bhutan
 – Khanate of Bukhara
 – Kingdom of Burma

C
 – Kingdom of Cayor
 – Great Qing
Chitral – Kingdom of Chitral under the Katoor Dynasty
Comancheria – Nʉmʉnʉʉ Sookobitʉ
 Cospaia – Republic of Cospaia
 Crimea – Crimean Khanate

D
 – Sultanate of Darfur
 – Dendi Kingdom
 Denmark–Norway – United Kingdoms of Denmark and Norway
 Durrani – Durrani Empire
 – Republic of the Seven United Netherlands

E
Ethiopia – Empire of Ethiopia

F
 – Kingdom of France

G
 – Kingdom of Garo
 – Republic of Genoa

H
 – Holy Roman Empire of the German Nation
 Hungary – Kingdom of Hungary

I
Ijebu – Kingdom of Ijebu

J
 – Kingdom of Janjero
 – Tokugawa shogunate
 – Johor Sultanate
 – Jolof Empire

K
 – Kingdom of Kaffa
 Kartli-Kakheti – Kingdom of Kartli–Kakheti
 Kazakh – Kazakh Khanate
 Khiva – Khanate of Khiva
Korea – Kingdom of Great Joseon
 – Khanate of Kokand
 Kongo – Kingdom of Kongo
 – Kingdom of Koya
 – Kuba Kingdom

L
Lucca – Republic of Lucca

M
 Malta – Order of Saint John 
 Maratha – Maratha Empire
 – Duchy of Massa and Carrara
 – Sultanate of Maguindanao
 – Duchies of Modena and Reggio
 – Principality of Moldavia - vassal of Ottoman Empire
 – Principality of Monaco
 – Sultanate of Morocco
Mrauk U – Kingdom of Mrauk U
 – Principality of Muang Phuan
 Mysore – Kingdom of Mysore

N
 – Kingdom of Naples and Sicily
 – Gorkha Kingdom of Nepal
 – Kingdom of Ngoyo

O
 – Sublime Ottoman State
 – Ouaddai Empire

P
 – States of the Church
 – Duchy of Parma and Placentia
 Persia – Persian Empire
 – Principality of Piombino
 Polish–Lithuanian Commonwealth Portugal – Kingdom of Portugal – Kingdom of Prussia

R Ragusa – Republic of Ragusa – Kingdom of Rapa NuiRozwi – Rozwi Empire – Russian Empire – Kingdom of Ryūkyū

S – Kingdom of Samoa – Most Serene Republic of San Marino – Khanate of Sarab – Kingdom of Sardinia – Funj sultanate of Sinnar – Kingdom of Spain – Sikh Confederacy Sulu – Sulu Sultanate – Kingdom of Sweden – Swiss Confederation

T Thonburi – Kingdom of Thonburi – Tu'i Tonga – Grand Duchy of Tuscany

V – Most Serene Republic of Venice

W – Kingdom of Waalo – Principality of Wallachia

Non-sovereign territories
Great Britain
 British America – British America and the British West Indies

Netherlands Dutch Cape Colony – Cape Colony

States claiming sovereignty Aceh – Sultanate of Aceh Corsica''' – Corsican Republic (to May 1769)